Waumpus world is a simple world use in artificial intelligence for which to represent knowledge and to reason. Vaumpus world was introduced by Genesereth, and is discussed in Russell-Norvig Artificial intelligence book inspired by 1972 video game Hunt the Wumpus .

References 
 CIS587: The Wumpus World
 Hunt the Wumpus

Artificial intelligence